Yankee Doodle Daffy is a Warner Bros. Looney Tunes theatrical cartoon short released on June 5, 1943, directed by Friz Freleng and written by Tedd Pierce. The short was the second Technicolor Looney Tunes entry to feature Porky Pig and Daffy Duck (after My Favorite Duck). It is also one of the handfuls of Looney Tunes and Merrie Melodies to have fallen into the public domain.

None of the voice actors were credited on screen. Mel Blanc performed most of the voices, while Billy Bletcher sang "In the Garden of My Heart" as Sleepy Lagoon. Richard Bickenbach received screen credit as animator, but other animators working on the film were Jack Bradbury, Gerry Chiniquy, Phil Monroe and Manuel Perez. Owen Fitzgerald was the layout artist, Paul Julian painted the backgrounds, and Lloyd Turner was the in-between artist.

The title and introductory music are inspired by the 1942 film Yankee Doodle Dandy, a major hit and a Warner release. Other than the fact of both films being about show business, they have no plot elements in common. It is one of the few Daffy Duck/Porky Pig cartoons to have fallen into the public domain after United Artists failed to renew the copyright by 1971.

Plot
At Smeller's Productions, Porky Pig, a producer, loaded down with luggage and a golf bag, hangs a sign on his office door reading "No casting today" and leaves his office in a hurry to board an airplane. However, Daffy Duck, a talent agent, stops Porky from leaving, wanting to secure an audition for his client, droopy-eyed child performer Sleepy Lagoon. The pitch, intended to demonstrate Sleepy's allegedly wide and varied repertoire, consists of Daffy himself performing an array of musical and stage acts in his usual, absurd and unoriginal fashion. Sleepy meanwhile stays seated, nonchalantly licking an enormous lollipop and silently commenting on Daffy's ludicrous behavior using signs bearing rebuses, such as "ham" ("excessively theatrical"), "screwball" ("crazy and absurd"), and "corn" ("corny").

The songs Daffy performs include "I'm Just Wild About Harry", William Tell Overture, "Chica Chica Boom Chic" (as Carmen Miranda), "Laugh, Clown, Laugh" (as Enrico Caruso as Canio in Pagliacci), and "Angel in Disguise" (same song Bugs Bunny and Sylvester perform in The Wabbit Who Came to Supper and Back Alley Oproar, respectively).

Porky, with mounting frustration (as it is his day off), repeatedly tries to escape from the pitch. Daffy handily foils each attempt in increasingly improbable ways, including by turning out to be the pilot of Porky's plane and then turning out to be the parachute Porky uses to escape said plane. After Daffy finally takes it upon himself to harass Porky with an outrageous finale, Porky decides to just get it over with by allowing Sleepy to audition.

Sleepy calmly leaves his seat and begins to sing the song, "In the Garden of My Heart" (a WB-owned song by Roma and Ball), in a strong, operatic baritone that is not only surprising given his small stature but also substantially more dramatic than any of the acts Daffy used in the pitch. However, during a high note near the end, he erupts into a long coughing fit before weakly croaking the rest of the line.

Analysis
Authors Michael S. Shull and David E. Wilt consider it ambiguous as to whether this cartoon contains a World War II-related reference. When Daffy is revealed as the pilot of the plane, he is wearing an aviator's goggles and helmet. In this guise, Daffy sings "We watch the skyways o'er the land and the sea, ready to fly anywhere the duty calls, ready to fight to be free". This could be a reference to military aviation.

Home media

United States
Yankee Doodle Daffy is available officially on DVD as part of Looney Tunes Golden Collection: Volume 1 by Warner Home Video.

See also
 Yankee Doodle Dandy, a 1942 American biographical musical film starting James Cagney, Joan Leslie, Walter Huston, and Richard Whorf.

Sources

References

External links

 
Watch Yankee Doodle Daffy in fully restored HD at Laugh Bureau Vintage
 Yankee Doodle Daffy on the Internet Archive

Looney Tunes shorts
1943 animated films
1943 films
Short films directed by Friz Freleng
1940s American animated films
Films about entertainers
Daffy Duck films
Porky Pig films
American musical comedy films
1943 musical comedy films
Films produced by Leon Schlesinger
Films scored by Carl Stalling